The Lyttelton Borough Council Chambers was the headoffice of the Lyttelton Borough Council from 1887 until the late 20th century, when the borough council moved to a number of other buildings. Civic use of the building stopped in 1999, when the building was sold for business and residential use. Registered by the New Zealand Historic Places Trust in 2003, the building was demolished in June 2011 following the 2011 Christchurch earthquake.

History
The Lyttelton Borough Council was inaugurated in 1868 as a successor to the 1862 Lyttelton municipal council. In February 1886, a committee of borough councillors agreed to have outlined plans drawn up for a purpose-built civic office for the local administration. At the time, any loans that a council wanted to raise were subject to public approval and a public meeting was held in August 1886 to discuss raising a £3,000 loan. The meeting was chaired by the mayor, Adam Chalmers, and the main speaker was Harry Allwright, a borough councillor and the local member of parliament. The issue was put to public vote as part of the borough councillor elections on 9 September 1886, where 442 electors supported the loan, with 26 against and 5 informal votes.

The building was designed by the Christchurch architecture firm Collins and Harman and they first advertised a construction tender two weeks after the election where the loan was approved. Tenders were opened at the borough council meeting on 2 November 1886, with ten tenders received ranging in price from £2,970 to £4,270. The lowest tender, by local Lyttelton contractors Hollis, Williams, and Green, was accepted. The building was a two-storey brick structure. The ground floor was for a resident magistrate's court and associated offices. The upper storey was for use by the borough council. The largest rooms were the court room and the borough council chamber. The building had frontages onto Sumner Road (then known as London Street) and Oxford Street. Access to the court was via a centrally located door in Oxford Street, and the council offices could be reached via a door at the eastern end of the Sumner Road frontage. The foundation stone was laid on 29 January 1887, and Allwright having just been elected mayor, his name was engraved in that stone:

H. Allwright, Mayor, 1887

There was no formal opening for the building, but the first council meeting was held in the new building on 18 October 1887. As the ground floor was used as a court, the fitout of that floor was done by prison labour and completion of that floor took longer.

Over time, the use of the court declined and in the end, the council chamber was used for court sittings, with borough council staff taking over the ground floor. With staff numbers continuing to increase, the borough council bought the Albion Hotel and shifted staff there in 1978. At that time, the Lyttelton Library moved from across the road into the former court premises. In 1991, council staff moved again, this time into the building of the Lyttelton Port Company. In 1999, the library was moved to its present building. Council placed a covenant on the building in 1999 and sold it to private interests for commercial use downstairs and residential use upstairs.

The building was demolished in June 2011.

Heritage designation
The building was registered as a Category II heritage building by the New Zealand Historic Places Trust on 12 September 2003.

References

Heritage New Zealand Category 2 historic places in Canterbury, New Zealand
1880s architecture in New Zealand
Buildings and structures demolished as a result of the 2011 Christchurch earthquake
Lyttelton, New Zealand